Ghost Town DJ's (often stylized as Ghostown DJs) is an American hip-hop group from Atlanta, Georgia whose members consist of
Dj DEMP, Rodney Terry, Greg Street and Kito, which recorded the 1996 hit single, "My Boo". The song was influenced by Miami bass and was a big hit on Miami's Y100 and Power 96. In early 2016, the song became a viral meme called the "Running Man Challenge", which first emerged on Vine.

Formation and recording of My Boo
Rodney Terry founded the group, inspired by the Miami bass genre that was popular during the 1980s. Originally, an artist named Akema Johnson-Day was slated to provide lead vocals for the song with Virgo Williams on background vocals, however, when a scheduling conflict prevented Akema from taking part in the production, Virgo Williams’ vocals became the lead vocals. Lil Jon was an A&R director for So So Def at the time and is noted as the executive producer of the song. Rodney Terry and Carl Mahone co-produced it, and it was the second version of the beat currently used in the song.

Name
The name was based upon Luther Campbell aka Luke Skyywalker’s Ghetto Style DJs, a Miami based DJ crew that was popular in the 1980s. Taking his inspiration from them, Terry chose the name, Ghost Town DJ's, which implies the term "ghost town" meaning to be heard and not seen. It is the reason why the group's members are never seen, but are enjoying the group's music. A matter of contention has been the misspelling of the name Ghostown DJ's with one T vs Ghost Town DJs which the group has been trying to correct for the past 22 years.

Discography

Compilation albums
1996: So So Def Bass All-Stars

Singles

References

American hip hop groups
Miami bass groups
Musical groups established in 1995
Musical groups disestablished in 1997
1995 establishments in Georgia (U.S. state)